Minden High School (MHS) is a secondary school located in Minden, Nebraska, United States.

About
MHS serves the town of Minden in Kearney County and the surrounding area. It takes in students from C.L. Jones Middle School and East Elementary School.

Athletics
The Whippets are members of the Southwest Conference.  They wear the colors of purple and white.  MHS offers competition in basketball, cheer/dance, cross country, football, golf, softball, track & field, volleyball, and wrestling.

References

External links

 Minden H.S.
 Minden Public Schools

Public high schools in Nebraska
Schools in Kearney County, Nebraska